South Saxons Hockey Club is a field hockey club based in Hastings, England. The club was established in 1895 and their home ground is currently located at Horntye Park Sports Complex. The club has a sand dressed astro-turf pitch, clubhouse, changing facilities and cafe bar on-site at Horntye Park.

The men's 1st XI play within the South Hockey League structure in South Hockey League Division 1 (East), and the ladies 1st XI play in the Martlets Ladies League Division 1.

The club fields four men's sides, two ladies' sides, three youth development teams and junior hockey 7s teams.

Teams

Men's
1st XI - South Hockey League - Division 1 East
2nd XI - Martlets Open League - Division 1
3rd XI -  Martlets Open League - Division 2
4th XI  - Martlets Open League - Division 4

Ladies
1st XI - Martlets Ladies League - Division 1
2nd XI - Martlets Ladies League - Division 3

Youth
 Warriors - Sussex Boys Development League
 Arrows - Sussex Boys Development League
 Bows - Sussex Girls Development League

Juniors
The club has a mixed junior development section of U10s to U12's. Boys, Girls and mixed teams represent the club in various hockey 7's knockout competitions across Sussex.

References

English field hockey clubs
Field hockey in England
Field hockey clubs established in 1895
1895 establishments in England
Sport in Hastings
Sport in Sussex
Sport in East Sussex